The Izmir Marathon (stylized as Maratonİzmir) is an annual road-based marathon hosted by İzmir, Turkey, since 2020.  A 10K is also held concurrently with the marathon.

The marathon is a World Athletics Label Road Race.

History 

The inaugural race was held on  during the coronavirus pandemic.

Kenyan runner Lani Rutto set a Turkish all-comers record of 2:09:27 during the 2022 race.

Course 

The marathon begins and ends on Şair Eşref Boulevard in front of Kültürpark, just north of the Montrö Gate, and runs largely along the coastline.

Marathoners first head northeast from the start and then roughly follow the coastline until a turnaround point near Bostanlı Pier in Karşıyaka about  into the race.

Other marathons 

References

External links 
 Official website

2020 establishments in Turkey
Annual sporting events in Turkey
April sporting events
Marathons in Turkey
Recurring sporting events established in 2020
Sports competitions in Izmir
Spring (season) events in Turkey